Palárikovo is a large village and municipality in the Nové Zámky District in the Nitra Region of south-west Slovakia.

Names and etymology
The village is named after a Slovak playwright Ján Palárik. The historic Slovak name Slovenský Meder was semantically the same as the Hungarian name Tótmegyer. Slovenský/Tót — Slovak, Meder/Megyer - the old Magyar tribe whose members lived in the region as garrison units.

History
In historical records the village was first mentioned in 1248.

Geography
The municipality lies at an altitude of 113 metres and covers an area of 51.294 km². It has a population of about 4410 people.

Ethnicity
The population is about 97% Slovak, 2% Hungarian and 1% Czech.

Facilities
The village has a small public library, a DVD rental store and cinema. It also has a gym and a football pitch.

Twin towns — sister cities

Palárikovo is twinned with:
 Zubří, Czech Republic

References

External links
http://www.statistics.sk/mosmis/eng/run.html
http://www.obecpalarikovo.sk/
http://www.palarikovo.com/
Palárikovo – Nové Zámky Okolie

Villages and municipalities in Nové Zámky District